"Memories of El Monte" is a doo-wop metasong released in 1963 by the Penguins featuring Cleve Duncan. It was written by Frank Zappa and Ray Collins before they were in the Mothers of Invention. The song was first released as Original Sound 27.

Composition

In 1960, Art Laboe released one of the first oldies compilations, Memories of El Monte, a collection of songs by bands that used to play at the dances Laboe organized at El Monte Legion Stadium in El Monte, California.

At some point in the next few years, Ray Collins visited Frank Zappa at his house at 314 W. G Street in Ontario, California. Frank told him that he and a friend had thought of writing a song entitled "Memories of El Monte." Ray had been to the dances at El Monte Legion Stadium and had played there with tenor saxophonist Chuck Higgins. Ray sat down at Frank's piano, played the "Earth Angel" chord changes and immediately came up with the first lyrics for "Memories of El Monte."

Frank Zappa took the song to Art Laboe, who loved it. Laboe came up with the idea of adding a section that named doo-wop groups and having the Penguins impersonate their songs.

"Memories of El Monte" was recorded at Paul Buff’s Pal Recording Studio in Cucamonga, California in 1963. The song was copyrighted on February 20, 1963.

Performers
 Cleve Duncan – lead vocals
 Walter Saulsberry – tenor vocals
 The Viceroys – backup vocals
 James Conwell
 Andrew "Jack" White
 Charles Jones
 Oliver Williams
 Herbert White
 Frank Zappa – xylophone

Although the track is credited to the Penguins featuring Cleve Duncan, and Zappa claimed it was recorded by "a bunch of guys from the car wash," it was actually sung by Cleve Duncan of the Penguins, backed by the Viceroys.

Contents
The song reminisces about dances at the El Monte Legion Stadium. It consists of two verses, followed by a spoken section listing a number of songs that would be sung, as excerpts, ending with "Earth Angel", followed by another verse.

It was one of the first songs that Frank Zappa wrote that he was able to get released. It is a doo wop style song. Zappa contended that the music that was happening during the 1950s was one of the finest things in American music.

Reception
"Memories of El Monte" was popular on the radio and sold well in a variety of markets but it did not chart nationally. It was a local hit, and led Cleve Duncan to reform the Penguins, who had broken up around 1959. It is now considered a perennial favorite, and Art Laboe has played it a lot.

Ray Collins has criticized the recording of the song, saying that, "Art Laboe's always had this thing about people recording R&B ballads too slow, I think he overcompensated and made "Memories of El Monte" too fast."

Royalties
Before his death in 2012, Ray Collins said he still got twice-yearly royalty checks from the song. Frank Zappa used a $1,500 advance against the royalties of "Grunion Run" (recorded by The Hollywood Persuaders) and "Memories of El Monte" to bail his girlfriend out of jail, and to get an attorney.

Songs Referenced in "Memories of El Monte"

 "In the Still of the Night" by The Five Satins
 "You Cheated" by The Shields
 "A Thousand Miles Away" by The Heartbeats
 "The Letter" by The Medallions
 "Cherry Pie" by Marvin & Johnny
 "Nite Owl" by Tony Allen & The Chimes billed as Tony Allen & The Champs
 "Earth Angel" by The Penguins

Album appearances
"Memories of El Monte" was released five times as a single:

"Memories of El Monte" appears on a 1984 live LP from Ace Records called Big Jay McNeely Meets the Penguins, as part of a medley with "Earth Angel". The original version also appears on the following compilations:

 Art Laboe's Memories Of El Monte (Original Sound, 1991)
 Cucamonga Years – The Early Works Of Frank Zappa (1962–1964) (MSI, Japan, 1991)
 Art Laboe's Dedicated To You (1992)
 Art Laboe's 60 Killer Oldies (1993)
 Oldies But Goodies, Vol. 3 (1994)
 The Doo-Wop Box II (Rhino, 1996)
 Cucamonga! Frank's Wild Years (Musical Tragedies, Germany, 1999)
 Cucamonga (Rhino, 2004)
 You’re an Angel by the Penguins (2010)

Pop culture references
A chapter in the book, Generations of youth: youth cultures and history in twentieth-century America by Joe Austin and Michael Willard, is entitled “Memories of El Monte" Intercultural Dance Halls in Post-World War II Los Angeles.

"Memories of El Monte" was used in the movie Colors. It is the name of an annual oldies show in El Monte. It is also the name of a textbook about El Monte.

When the Mothers of Invention played at The Trip, a club in Los Angeles, they got a lot of requests for "Help, I'm a Rock" and "Memories of El Monte." No one danced during these songs because there are spoken sections which would cause the audience to stop dancing and listen. Elmer Valentine wanted people to dance in his club because if someone looked in the door and saw an empty dance floor they wouldn't come in. One night, the Mothers of Invention played the "Help, I'm a Rock" and "Memories of El Monte" for an hour and no one danced. Immediately after that they were selling pop bottles to get money for cigarettes and bologna.

References

1963 singles
Songs about California
Songs written by Frank Zappa
Doo-wop songs
El Monte, California
1963 songs
Song recordings produced by Frank Zappa